Blossom Time at Ronnie Scott's is a 1966 live album by Blossom Dearie.

Recorded at Ronnie Scott's Jazz Club, this was Dearie's first live album.

Track listing
"On Broadway" (Barry Mann, Cynthia Weil, Jerry Leiber, Mike Stoller) – 3:55
"(Ah, the Apple Trees) When the World Was Young" (Michel Philippe-Gérard, Angele Vannier, Johnny Mercer) – 4:20
"When in Rome" (Cy Coleman, Carolyn Leigh) – 4:45
"The Shadow of Your Smile" (Johnny Mandel, Paul Francis Webster) – 4:13
"Ev'rything I've Got" (Richard Rodgers, Lorenz Hart) – 4:29
"Once Upon a Summertime" (Eddie Barclay, Michel Legrand, Eddy Marnay, Johnny Mercer) – 3:51
"I'm Hip" (Dave Frishberg, Bob Dorough) – 2:48
"Mad About the Boy" (Noël Coward) – 5:05
"The Shape of Things" (Sheldon Harnick) – 2:42
"Satin Doll" (Duke Ellington, Johnny Mercer, Billy Strayhorn) – 5:15

Personnel
Blossom Dearie – piano, vocals
Jeff Clyne – double bass
Johnny Butts – drums

References

1966 live albums
Blossom Dearie live albums
Fontana Records live albums
Albums recorded at Ronnie Scott's Jazz Club